The 2021 BYU Cougars men's volleyball team represented Brigham Young University in the 2021 NCAA Division I & II men's volleyball season. The Cougars, led by sixth year head coach Shawn Olmstead, play their home games at Smith Fieldhouse. The Cougars are members of the MPSF and were picked to win the MPSF in the preseason poll. After finishing last season ranked #1 the Cougars enter the 2021 season with the #1 ranking.

Season highlights
Will be filled in as the season progresses.

Roster

Schedule
TV/Internet Streaming information:
All home games will be televised on BYUtv. All road games will also be streamed by the schools streaming service. The conference tournament will be streamed by FloVolleyball. The NCAA Tournament will be streamed on B1G+ (opening round, quarterfinals), NCAA.com (semifinals), and the Championship will be televised nationally on ESPNU.

 *-Indicates conference match.
 Times listed are Mountain Time Zone.

Announcers for televised games
UCLA: Jarom Jordan & Steve Vail
UCLA: Jarom Jordan & Steve Vail
Pepperdine: Jarom Jordan & Steve Vail
Pepperdine: Jarom Jordan & Steve Vail
Grand Canyon: Jarom Jordan & Steve Vail
Grand Canyon: Jarom Jordan & Steve Vail
Grand Canyon: Kyle Borg & Diana Johnson
Grand Canyon: Kyle Borg & Diana Johnson
Concordia Irvine:  Viola Patience O'Neal
USC: Mark Beltran & Paul Duchesne
Stanford: Jarom Jordan & Steve Vail
Stanford: Jarom Jordan & Steve Vail
Pepperdine: Al Epstein
Pepperdine: Al Epstein
Concordia Irvine: Viola Patience O'Neal
Concordia Irvine: Anthony Calderon
USC: Jarom Jordan & Steve Vail
USC: Jarom Jordan & Steve Vail
UCLA: Denny Cline
UCLA: Denny Cline
Grand Canyon: Jarom Jordan & Steve Vail
Pepperdine: Jarom Jordan & Steve Vail
Lewis: Paul Sunderland & Kevin Barnett
Hawai'i: Paul Sunderland & Kevin Barnett

Rankings 

^The Media did not release a Pre-season, Week 13, or Week 14 poll.

References

2021 in sports in Utah
2021 NCAA Division I & II men's volleyball season
2021 team
2021 Mountain Pacific Sports Federation volleyball season